Acar is a type of salad made in Indonesia, Malaysia, and Singapore.

Acar may also refer to:

 Acar (surname)
 Acar, Dicle
 Acar, Sason, a village in Sason, Batman, Turkey
 Acar (bivalve), a genus of clams
 Angular Correlation of Electron Positron Annihilation Radiation, an experimental techniques of solid-state physics

See also
 Acarlar (disambiguation)
 Banvit Kara Ali Acar Sport Hall, an indoor arena in Bandırma, Balıkesir Province, Turkey
 Aircraft Communications Addressing and Reporting System or ACARS